Ian Gordon (born May 15, 1975) is a Canadian-born German former professional ice hockey goaltender who last played for ERC Ingolstadt of the Deutsche Eishockey Liga.

Career 
After playing in the American Hockey League and the International Hockey League, Gordon moved to Germany in 2000, when he signed with the SERC Wild Wings. After three seasons, he transferred to the Frankfurt Lions in 2003, won the German title with the Lions in his first season in Frankfurt, and remained with the team until 2010 when the Lions folded due to financial difficulties. Gordon became a naturalized German citizen on November 18, 2008.

On July 7, 2010, Gordon signed a contract with Ingolstadt. Gordon announced his retirement after the 2012–13 season.

References

External links
 

1975 births
Living people
Canadian ice hockey goaltenders
Cleveland Lumberjacks players
ERC Ingolstadt players
Frankfurt Lions players
Grand Rapids Griffins (IHL) players
Ice hockey people from Saskatchewan
Sportspeople from North Battleford
Saint John Flames players
Saskatoon Blades players
Schwenninger Wild Wings players
Swift Current Broncos players
Utah Grizzlies (IHL) players
Naturalized citizens of Germany
Canadian expatriate ice hockey players in Germany